Soddo (autonym kəstane "Christian"; formerly called Aymälläl in Western sources, after a particular dialect of it) is a Gurage language spoken by a quarter million people in southeastern Ethiopia. It is an Ethiopian Semitic language of the Northern Gurage subfamily. Its native speakers, the Soddo Gurage people (Kistane), live predominantly in the Soddo district of the Gurage Zone.

Phonology

Consonants 

 [ʔ] is mainly heard when in between vowels, or in syllable-initial position before vowels.
 Sounds /p, pʼ, tsʼ/ can also be heard in borrowed words.
 Sounds /k, ɡ, kʼ/ can also have labialized allophones [kʷ, ɡʷ, kʼʷ].
 /b/ can also be heard as a voiced fricative [β] when in intervocalic position.
 /m/ can be heard as [ɱ] when before /f/, and /n/ as [ŋ] when before /k/.

Vowels

Grammar

Noun
As in most Ethiopian languages, noun qualifiers generally follow the noun.

The definite article is expressed by the suffix -i, e.g.: goš "boy" > goš-i "the boy"; ätit "sister" > ätiti "the sister"; bayyočč "children" > bayyočč-i.  If the noun ends in -a or -ä, it normally loses this vowel when -i is suffixed: angačča "cat" > angačč-i "the cat".  A noun ending in -i usually stays the same: abi "(the) father, proprietor".  A noun ending in -e, -o, -u adds a y before the suffix: ge "house" > geʸi "the house"; wälläho "neighbor" > wällähoʸi "the neighbor".  If the noun has a qualifier, the article is used with the first element: maläk' ge "big house" > maläk'-i ge "the big house"; yä-šum-i ge "the house of the official" (lit. "of-official-the house"); yä-mät't'-i məss "the man who came" (lit. "who-came-the man".)

There is no real indefinite article, though indefiniteness can be expressed by preposing the word attə or k'una, meaning "one".

Nouns have two genders, masculine and feminine, which affect verb concord.

Nouns which are definite objects (direct or indirect) are both marked with the prefix yä- or nä-: e.g. yä-geʸi ažžo "he saw the house"; yä-zämmihʷan abännət "he gave it to his brother" (lit. "to-his-brother he-gave-him").  Direct objects may additionally be marked by adding the object suffix pronouns to the verb: e.g. yabiddi täšakkunnət "I asked my father" (lit. "my-father-obj. I-asked-him".)

A possessed noun is marked by the prefix yä-, and the possessor precedes the possessed: yä-šum-i ge "the house of the official" (lit. "of-official-the house").  If the possessed noun has a preposition prefixed to it, this yä- is omitted: babiddi färäz rather than *bä-yä-abiddi färäz for "on my father's horse".

Pronoun

Personal pronoun

Possessives can also be formed by simply adding yä- to the standalone pronouns, e.g.: yädähəm t'əb "your clan".

Reflexive pronouns are formed by äras-, gubba-, k'um- plus the possessive suffixes, e.g. ädi äras-əddi mät'afi t'afkunnət "I myself wrote the book".

Demonstrative pronoun

Proximal: zi "this, these"; zini "this one".  E.g.: zi məss "this man", zi məšt "this woman", zi säbočč "these men".

Distal: za "that, those, that one, those ones"; zani "that one there".  E.g. tä-za məss goy mät't'ahi "I came with that man".

Interrogative pronoun

ma "who?" (man before the copula): man mät't'a? "who came?"
yäma "whose?"
 mən "what?"; yämən "why?"
 yitta, yittat "which?" E.g. yitta bayy mät't'am "which child came?"
 yittani "which one?"

Indefinite pronoun

 (yähonä) säb "someone, somebody"
 mannəm (säb) "any(one)" ("no one" with negative verb)
 attəm "any" (="no one, nothing" with negative verb); attəmu "no one" (as pronoun)
 lela (säb) "other"
 yäk'irrä k'äy "other" (lit. "remaining thing")
 attə "a certain"
 ləyyu "different"
 k'una, zam, zəč'ə "same"
 äbälo (f. äbälit) "so-and-so"
 zihom "such"

kulləm = "all" (placed before or after the noun); kulləm-u, bä-mollaw = "whole".  yät'oma = "only, alone".  "Each, every" is expressed by noun reduplication.

Copula and existential verbs

The copula (positive and negative) is irregular in the present tense:

Example: zämmidi nähä "you are my brother".

The past tense ("he was", etc.) is expressed by the verb näbbär conjugated regularly in the perfect; "he was not" etc. is with annäbär.  The future tense is expressed by the imperfect of hono: yəhonu "he will be", etc.  The negative future tense is likewise expressed by tihon.  The present copula  in subordinate clauses is expressed by the subordinate perfect of honä, e.g.: däffär yähonä tädi-goy yalfu "he who is courageous will go with me.

"It is he", etc. can be expressed by adding an element -tt between the pronoun and the copula: e.g. kʷa-ttə-n "it is he".

The existential verb "be at", "exist" in the present is:

In the past and future, it is expressed just like the copula, with näbbärä and honä.  In subordinate clauses the present is expressed with -allä conjugated in the perfect (negative -lellä), e.g.: bämeda yalləmi säbočč araš näm "the people who are in the field are farmers".

The possessive verb "he has" etc. is expressed with the existential verb yino "it is" (agreeing with the object possessed) plus object suffix pronouns (i.e. "it is to him" etc.)

Verbs
A Soddo verb may have anywhere from one to four consonants, or may be a compound with balo "say" (e.g. bək'k' balo "appear".)  In the former case, they fall into three "conjugations" differing in their vowels and in gemination of the imperfect, illustrated for a three-consonant verb:
 säbbäro, imperfect yəsäbru ("break")
 tikkälo, imperfect yətikkəlu
 č'affäro, imperfect yəč'affəru

Derived stems can be formed in several ways:
 reduplicative: e.g. gäddälo "kill" > gədaddälo.  This form has a wide variety of meanings, mostly intensifying the verb in some way.
 passive/reflexive/intransitive tä- prefix: e.g. käffälo "pay" > tä-käffälo "be paid".  A reciprocal action can be expressed by this prefix attached to a transitive verb with the vowel a after the first radical, or a reduplicative form, e.g. tä-gäddäl-mun or tä-gdaddäl-mun "they killed each other".
 causative or transitive of intransitive verbs a-: e.g. säkkäro "be drunk" > a-säkkäro "get someone drunk"; näddädo "burn (intr.)" > a-näddädo "burn (tr.)".
 causative of transitive or passive verbs at- (+ -i-): e.g. käddäno "cover" > at-kiddäno "cause to cover" or "cause to be covered".  Added to the -a- form, it expresses reciprocity and adjutative (helping): atgaddälo "cause to kill one other" or help to kill".
 Some verbs are formed with initial ən- or tän-; the only derived stem from these is the a- stem, with a- replacing ə- or tä-.  E.g. ənkrättäto "be bent" > ankrättäto "bend".

There are two tenses/aspects, perfective (past) and imperfective (non-past); each has distinct forms for main versus subordinate clauses, and positive versus negative.  There are also distinct jussive, imperative, and impersonal forms.

Conjugations

Perfect

The form with suffixed -m is used in subordinate clauses to connect verbs not otherwise connected, in a way analogous to Japanese -te; it can be translated as "and", as a gerund, or as a resultative.  The perfect in -m followed by näbbär forms the pluperfect.

The negative perfect is formed by prefixing al-, with vowel change; for the conjugations mentioned above, the resulting forms are al-säfärä, al-täkkälä, and al-č'afärä.

Examples: ge aräššo "he built a house"; banätäw k'ən awänna-m bämida tonnaw "having put butter on the top of his head, he sat outside".

Imperfect

Like the perfect, the subordinate forms can take the suffix -m to express a series of non-past actions.  This can be combined with näbbär to express a habitual past action.

Examples: ahoññ gäbäya nalfu "today we shall go to the market"; yəgädəl məss "the man who kills"; mas tənäsa-m yibara wawt'a tək'ärsi "she picks up the sleeping mats and begins to remove the dung."

It can be augmented by -ən, with no obvious change in meaning.

Examples: ahoññ yəmät'a timäsəl "it does not seem that he will come today"; ädahʷan t-aykäfəl alläfo "he left without paying his debt".

Jussive and Imperative

These are negated by the prefix ay-: ayəsfär, ayšäkkət, aygalb.  The 2nd person forms then change to conform to the others: attəsfär, attəsfer, attəsfärəm, attəsfärma.

E.g.: yä-wäzälawan-hom yewsəd "let him take according to his work"; yäsäb waga attəlgäd "don't touch someone's property"; ärəf-əm tona "rest and sit down" (sit down quietly).

References

 Cohen, Marcel, Etudes d'éthiopien méridional. Paris: Geuthner 1931.
 Gideon Goldenberg, "Kəstanəñña: Studies in a Northern Gurage Language of Christians", in: Orientalia Suecana 17 (1968), 61-102 [=Gideon Goldenberg, Studies in Semitic Linguistics, The Magnes Press: Jerusalem 1998 ].
 Gideon Goldenberg, "L'étude du gouragué et la comparaison chamito-sémitique", in: Accademia Nazionale dei Lincei, Roma - Problemi attuali di Scienza e di Cultura, Quad. N. 191 II (1974), pp. 235–249 [=Studies in Semitic Linguistics, pp. 463–477].
 Gideon Goldenberg, "The Semitic Languages of Ethiopia and Their Classification", in: Bulletin of the School of Oriental and African Studies 40 (1977), pp. 461–507. [=Studies in Semitic Linguistics, pp. 286–332].
 Gideon Goldenberg, "Linguistic Interest in Gurage and the Gurage Etymological Dictionary" [Review article of Wolf Leslau (1979)], in: Annali, Istituto Universitario Orientale di Napoli 47 (1987), pp. 75–98. [=Studies in Semitic Linguistics, pp. 439–462].
 Gideon Goldenberg, "Two points of Kəstane grammar", in: Grover Hudson (ed.), Essays on Gurage language and culture : dedicated to Wolf Leslau on the occasion of his 90th birthday, November 14, 1996, Harrassowitz: Wiesbaden 1996, pp. 93–99.
 Wolf Leslau, Ethiopians speak : Studies in cultural background, III. Soddo. Near Eastern Studies, 11. Berkeley: University of California Press 1968.
 Wolf Leslau, Etymological Dictionary of Gurage (Ethiopic). 3 vols. Wiesbaden: Harrassowitz 1979. .
 Wolf Leslau, Gurage Studies: Collected Articles, Otto Harrassowitz: Wiesbaden 1992. 
 Johannes Mayer, Kurze Wörtersammlung in Englisch, Deutsch, Amharisch, Gallansich, Guraguesch, herausgegeben von Dr. L. Krapf. Basel: Pilgermissions-Buchdruckerei St. Grischona 1878.
 Franz Praetorius, "Ueber den Dialekt von Gurāguē", in: Die amharische Sprache, Halle 1879, pp. 507–523 (second appendix).
 Robert Hetzron, "Main Verb-Markers in Northern Gurage", in: Africa XXXVIII (1968), pp. 156–172.
 yä-Kəstane Gurage əmmät (həzb) tarik. Addis Ababa 1986 (Ethiopian calendar).

External links
 Christian recordings in Soddo in Global Recordings website.
 World Atlas of Language Structures information on Soddo

Languages of Ethiopia
Outer Ethiopian Semitic languages